George Ogilvy Reid (1851-1928) was a Scottish landscape and portrait artist operating in the late 19th and early 20th century. He lived his entire life in Leith, the harbour area of Edinburgh.

Life

Born in Leith in 1851, he originally studied to be an engraver.

He later studied art at the Trustee’s Academy on Picardy Place (the forerunner of the Edinburgh College of Art).

In October 1891 he received a Royal Commission to paint the baptism of Queen Victoria’s grandchild, Prince Maurice of Battenburg. At this time he was living in a flat at 12 Warrender Park Terrace and had a studio at 20 George Street in the New Town in Edinburgh.

In 1896 he was sculpted by David Watson Stevenson.

In 1911 he was living at 11 Carlton Street in Stockbridge, Edinburgh and had studios at the Synod Hall on Castle Terrace.

He died on 11 April 1928. He is buried near the north-west corner of Rosebank Cemetery in Edinburgh with his wife, Christian MacNab. Their daughter, Christian MacPherson Reid (d.1937) also lies with them.

Works
James Russell, First Provost of Motherwell (1865-8), North Lanarkshire Council Collection
A. Blair Spence (1814-1895), Dundee Art Gallery
Standing Female Nude with Long Brown Hair, Edinburgh College of Art
The Baptism of Prince Maurice (sketch), National Gallery of Scotland
Self Portrait (1882), Gordon Highlanders Museum
Queen Victoria (oil sketch, 1891), National Gallery of Scotland
Prince Henry of Battenburg (oil sketch, 1891), Royal Scottish Academy
 Princess Beatrice of Battenburgh (oil sketch, 1891), Royal Scottish Academy
Prince Alexander of Battenburg (oil sketch, 1891), Royal Scottish Academy
Princess Victoria Eugenie of Battenburg (oil sketch, 1891), Royal Scottish Academy
The Baptism of Prince Maurice (1892), Scottish National Portrait Gallery
After Killiecrankie, the Death of Claverhouse (1897), Royal Scottish Academy
1914- The Belgians on the March, Glasgow Museums

References

Dictionary of Scottish Painters, Julian Halsby

External links
Art UK
http://www.bournefineart.com/Artist/p/artist/447
https://www.nationalgalleries.org/collection/artists-a-z/r/artist/george-ogilvy-reid

1851 births
1928 deaths
19th-century Scottish painters
Scottish male painters
20th-century Scottish painters
Royal Scottish Academicians
Artists from Edinburgh
Alumni of the Edinburgh College of Art
People from Leith
19th-century Scottish male artists
20th-century Scottish male artists